The 3rd Reserve Officers' Training Corps Brigade is an Army Reserve Officers' Training Corps brigade based at the Great Lakes Naval Training Center, Illinois.  The Commander is COL Adam Lewis and the Command Sergeant Major is CSM Gareth Kilpatrick.

Battalions

Illinois 
 Eastern Illinois University
 Illinois State University
 Loyola University Chicago
 Northern Illinois University
 Southern Illinois University Carbondale
 Southern Illinois University Edwardsville
 University of Illinois - Chicago
 University of Illinois Urbana-Champaign
 Western Illinois University
 Wheaton College
 Robert Morris University (Illinois)

Iowa 
 Iowa State University
 University of Iowa
 University of Northern Iowa

Kansas 
 Kansas State University
 Pittsburg State University
 University of Kansas

Michigan 
 Michigan Technological University
 Northern Michigan University

Minnesota 
 Minnesota State University, Mankato
 Bethany Lutheran College
 Gustavus Adolphus College
 Saint John's University
 Saint Cloud State University
 University of Minnesota - Twin Cities

Missouri
University of Central Missouri
University of Missouri
Truman State University
Missouri State University
Washington University in St. Louis

Nebraska 
 Creighton University
 University of Nebraska at Lincoln
 University of Nebraska at Kearney

North Dakota 
 North Dakota State University
 University of North Dakota

South Dakota 
 South Dakota School of Mines
 South Dakota State University
 University of South Dakota

Wisconsin 
 Marquette University
 University of Wisconsin–La Crosse
 University of Wisconsin–Madison
 University of Wisconsin–Stevens Point

Fox Valley Battalion
 University of Wisconsin–Oshkosh
 Ripon College
 Marian University
 St. Norbert College
 University of Wisconsin–Green Bay
The Badger Battalion:
University of Wisconsin–Whitewater 
Maranatha Baptist University
Edgewood College
The Northwoods Battalion:
University of Wisconsin–Stout
University of Wisconsin–Eau Claire
University of Wisconsin–River Falls

Reserve Officers' Training Corps